Kabu is the second album by the Ethiopian singer Aster Aweke. It was released in 1991 via Columbia Records.

The album peaked at No. 4 on Billboard'''s World Music chart.

Production
The Washington D.C.-based Aweke sang the song lyrics in her native Amharic language. The album was produced by Iain Scott and Bunt Stafford Clark. Aweke mixed soul music sounds with Ethiopian instruments, including the krar.

Critical receptionTrouser Press deemed the album "heavy on midtempo grooves and ballads," writing that "the synthesizer on 'Kabu (Sacred Rock)' mimics a bass kalimba while Aweke’s vocals swoop and soar like a hummingbird." Spin called it "mildly disappointing," but praised Aweke's voice for cutting through the "snooty" production. Entertainment Weekly thought that "Kabu broadens the U.S.-based singer’s range with tight waves of fusion-based rock over which she can madly surf." Robert Christgau singled out "Yedi Gosh (My Guy)" for praise.The New York Times wrote that Aweke's "voice, thin, but sure and pliable, weaves in and around, stenciling delicate melodies against the band." The Calgary Herald determined that "the horn charts are brash and brassy while the marimbas, shakers and bass convey a sense of the primal." Stereo Review concluded that "Aweke unleashes her inner self, uttering oddly twisted wails and singing intricately elaborated melodic lines that can be as lovely as a piece of lace or as tough as a spider's web." The Province'' opined that "Aweke sounds more sure of her direction and more at home in music that also is a happier blend of her roots and North American pop and jazz."

AllMusic wrote that "Aweke's voice sounds even earthier and more passionate than on her debut album."

Track listing

References

1991 albums
Columbia Records albums